Banging Down the Doors is the first officially released album by Ezra Furman & The Harpoons. It was released in 2007. The titles on the album are largely the same as those originally recorded and self-released by the band as Beat Beat Beat, but they were all re-recorded for Banging Down the Doors.

Track listing
 "Mother's Day"
 "How Long, Diana?"
 "I Wanna Be A Sheep"
 "I Wanna Be Ignored"
 "American Highway"
 "God Is A Middle-Aged Woman"
 "Hotel Room In Casablanca"
 "Halloween Snow"
 "The Little Red-Haired Girl"
 "My Soul Has Escaped From My Body"
 "She's All I Got Left"
 "I Dreamed Of Moses"
 "Lydia Sherman"

References

2007 albums